Dikella is a village in the western part of the municipality of Alexandroupoli, Greece. It lies near the coast, 15 km west of the city centre and 4 km west of Makri. Its population was 290 in 2011. It is part of the local community of Makri.

References

External links
Dikella on GTP Travel Pages

Alexandroupolis
Villages in Greece
Populated places in Evros (regional unit)